USTS Kennedy  (T-AK-5059), callsign KVMU, IMO number 6621662, is a former commercial freighter and a current training vessel of the United States Maritime Service.

Construction and early years
United States Training Ship Kennedy was laid down in 1964 as Velma Lykes, a Maritime Administration (MARAD) break bulk cargo freighter type (C4-S-66a) hull under Maritime Administration contract (MA 182) at Avondale Industries, New Orleans, LA.  She was delivered to Lykes Brothers Steamship Company in 1966.  She was known as Velma Lykes until the vessel was reacquired by MARAD and she was renamed Cape Bon.

Government service

She served the US Government for over 20 years including several tours to the Persian Gulf as part of the First Gulf War before she was laid up in reserve at Suisun Bay, Benicia, CA as part of the Maritime Administrations National Defense Reserve Fleet.

In 2001, Cape Bon was moved to Buzzards Bay, MA for preparation to replace Patriot State as the Training Ship for the Massachusetts Maritime Academy.  She was converted to be a training ship at Bender Ship Repair in Mobile, Alabama, being delivered and christened Enterprise, after the school's original training ship USS Enterprise, on National Maritime Day 2003.  She was renamed Kennedy in January 2009 in honor of the Kennedy Family.

Kennedy is currently under the command of Massachusetts Maritime Academy alumnus Captain Michael Campbell.

Relief work
Kennedy was deployed to New York Harbor in support of Hurricane Sandy relief efforts in 2012 and Hurricane Maria in Puerto Rico in 2017. Its mission was to house first responders and FEMA SCF personnel

References

External links
 http://www.globalsecurity.org/military/facility/buzzards-bay.htm
 http://www.maritime.edu/index.cfm?pg=405
 http://wikimapia.org/16879888/USTS-Kennedy
 http://www.navsource.org/archives/09/13/135059.htm

Transports of the United States Navy
Merchant ships of the United States
Ships of the Massachusetts Maritime Academy
Training ships of the United States
Ships built in Bridge City, Louisiana
1967 ships